The Baraolt is a right tributary of the river Olt in Romania. It discharges into the Olt in Căpeni.

Tributaries

The following rivers are tributaries to the river Baraolt:

Left: Durca, Brad, Macicaș, Ozunca, Pârâul Cetății, Pârâul Uscat
Right: Herculian, Biucoș, Agriș, Pârâul Lupului, Dungo

References

Rivers of Romania
Rivers of Covasna County